Patience Ann McIntyre (born August 15, 1942)  and Prudence Ann McIntyre (born July 12, 1945), known professionally as Patience and Prudence, are two sisters who were a young vocal duo active from 1956 to 1964.

Career
Patience and Prudence McIntyre were born in 1942 and 1945, respectively, in Los Angeles, California. Their father, Mark McIntyre was an orchestra leader, pianist, and songwriter who worked with Frank Sinatra in the 1940s. Patience was named after a woman who authored poetry for The Ladies’ Home Journal in the 1920s, and her younger sister Prudence’s name was selected as one that fit with her older sister's. As youngsters, the girls studied piano and learned to read music. In the summer of 1956, their father brought 11-year-old Prudence and 14-year-old Patience into the Liberty Records studio in Los Angeles.

The duo made a demonstration recording of the song, "Tonight You Belong to Me," which had been a hit for Gene Austin in 1927, and was written by Billy Rose and Lee David. Liberty signed them and immediately released a recording of the girls singing the song as a commercial single (with the B-side, "A Smile and a Ribbon," a composition with music by Mark McIntyre) and by September the song reached #4 on the Billboard charts and #28 in the UK Singles Chart, and was the biggest selling record put out by Liberty for two years. It sold over one million copies and reached gold record status. It went on to become one of the best-selling in-store singles in the United States in September 1956.

Their song "Gonna Get Along Without Ya Now" reached #11 on the Billboard chart and #22 in the UK; its B-side, "The Money Tree," reached #73 in the U.S. They appeared on the Perry Como Show on television in September of that same year. They also released other singles such as "Little Wheel" and "All I Do Is Dream of You" but failed to reach the charts again.

They released several other singles on the Chattahoochee Records label, including a 1964 re-recording of "Tonight You Belong to Me". In 1978, they reunited to appear on a Dick Clark television feature and stated that they both didn't want to be performers in the first place and that their success was just an "accident". They also stated that their father didn't want them to be in the spotlight for personal reasons so he declined all other television and commercial offers which prevented both of the girls from furthering their professional music careers.

Collectors Choice issued a CD compilation of all their Liberty Records singles. Both Patience and Prudence are currently living in Wisconsin.

Discography

Singles

Extended plays
A Smile And A Song  (1957)

In culture
 The track "Tonight You Belong to Me" is used in the end credits of Birth (2004).
 The track "Tonight You Belong to Me" is used in the Milka commercial "le dernier carré" in 2013.
 The track "Tonight You Belong to Me" was used in the first and the final episodes of American Horror Story: Murder House.
 The track "Tonight You Belong to Me" was used in episode 14 of Bunheads sung by Sutton Foster and Hunter Foster.
 The track "A Smile and A Ribbon" was used in episode 18 of Bunheads.
 The track "A Smile and A Ribbon" was used in the Terry Zwigoff film Ghost World. It was previously used in the graphic novel upon which the film was based.
 The track "Tonight You Belong to Me" is used in the 1979 movie The Jerk sung by Bernadette Peters and Steve Martin.
 The track "Tonight You Belong to Me" is used in the 2014 visual novel Liar Liar 2 by tokimekiwaku.
 The track "Tonight You Belong to Me" was sampled in a variety of Aha Gazelle's songs from his album Free Barabbas.
The track "Tonight You Belong to Me" is used in the 2018 Google commercial "Assistant Google".
 The track "Tonight You Belong to Me" was used in the first and sixth episodes of American Horror Story: Apocalypse.
The track "Tonight You Belong to Me" is used in the sixth episode of You.
The track "Tonight You Belong to Me" is used in the film K-12
 The track "Tonight You Belong to Me" was used in season 6, episode 7 of Fear the Walking Dead.
 The track "The Money Tree" was used in Season 4, episode 6 of The Marvelous Mrs. Maisel.
 Patience & Prudence made their debut in gaming in 2022, when their song "Witchcraft" was used in The Quarry.

See also
List of Liberty Records artists

References

External links
 The Patience and Prudence story
 

Sibling musical duos
American women singers
American child singers
Liberty Records artists
Musical groups established in the 1950s